Woodrums' Building, also known as Woodrum Home Outfitting Co. building, is a historic commercial building located at Charleston, West Virginia, United States. It is a six-story commercial building located in the central business district of Charleston. The property consists of an original commercial structure built in 1916 and a rear addition built in 1937.

It was listed on the National Register of Historic Places in 1996.  It was also listed as a contributing property in the Downtown Charleston Historic District in 2006.

References

Commercial buildings completed in 1916
Buildings and structures in Charleston, West Virginia
Commercial buildings on the National Register of Historic Places in West Virginia
Buildings designated early commercial in the National Register of Historic Places in West Virginia
National Register of Historic Places in Charleston, West Virginia
Individually listed contributing properties to historic districts on the National Register in West Virginia